Struben is a surname, likely of German origin. Notable people with the surname include:

Edith Frances Mary Struben (1868–1936), South African botanical illustrator and painter
Harry Struben (1840–1915), German miner

See also
Somerset de Chair (1911–1995), full name Somerset Struben de Chair, English author, politician, and poet
Struben Dam Bird Sanctuary, a dam and nature preserve in Gauteng, South Africa